Tint Swe is a common Burmese name and may refer to:

 Kyaw Tint Swe (born 1945), incumbent Minister for the Office of the State Counsellor of Myanmar
 Tint Swe (politician, born in 1948), former Minister of National Coalition Government of the Union of Burma
 Tint Swe (minister) (born 1936), former Deputy Minister of Construction of Myanmar

See also 
 Swe (name)
 Tint (name)